This is a list of major political controversies in Albania:

References

 
Albania
Scandals